This is a list of the extreme points and extreme elevations in Mongolia.

Extreme points

Extreme altitude

See also
Geography of Mongolia
Extreme points of Asia

Notes

References

Geography of Mongolia
Mongolia